ITT may refer to:

Communication

Infantry-Tank Telephone, a device allowing infantrymen to speak to the occupants of armoured vehicles.

Mathematics
Intuitionistic type theory, other name of Martin-Löf Type Theory
Intensional type theory

Business
ITT Inc. (formerly International Telephone & Telegraph), US
Invitation to tender for a contract
 ITT Semiconductors

Education
ITT Technical Institute, US
Former Institute of Technology, Tallaght, Dublin, Ireland
Institute of Technology, Tralee, Ireland

Media
Cousin Itt, of the fictional Addams Family
"I.T.T (International Thief Thief)", a political screed about ITT Corp. by Fela Kuti

Medicine
Insulin tolerance test
Intention to treat analysis in medicine
Intermittent testicular torsion

Sport
Individual time trial in bicycle racing